James Donald Watson (10 August 1872 – 25 December 1958) was a New Zealand rugby union player. A forward, Watson represented Taranaki at a provincial level, and was a member of the New Zealand national side, the All Blacks, in 1896. He played one match for the All Blacks, against Queensland at Wellington.

Following the death of Henry Butland in 1956, Watson was the oldest living All Black.

References

1872 births
1958 deaths
English emigrants to New Zealand
New Zealand international rugby union players
New Zealand rugby union players
Rugby union forwards
Rugby union players from Rochdale
Taranaki rugby union players